Anglican Diocese of Ajayi Crowther is one of 17 within the Anglican Province of Ibadan, itself one of 14 provinces within the Church of Nigeria. The current bishop is Olugbenga Oduntan.

Notes

Dioceses of the Province of Ibadan
 
Church of Nigeria dioceses